Oleg Tonoritchi (born 21 November 1973) is a Moldovan cyclist. He competed in the men's individual road race at the 1996 Summer Olympics.

References

External links
 

1973 births
Living people
Moldovan male cyclists
Olympic cyclists of Moldova
Cyclists at the 1996 Summer Olympics
Place of birth missing (living people)